Xavier Julián Isaac (born 1 December 1962) is an Argentine military officer, currently serving as Chief of the General Staff of the Argentine Air Force since February 2020.

References

1962 births
Living people
Military personnel from Buenos Aires
Argentine Air Force brigadiers
Argentine Air Force personnel